Amoya is a genus of gobies in the family Gobiidae native to the Indian Ocean and the western Pacific Ocean.

Species
There are currently five recognized species in this genus:
 Amoya gracilis (Bleeker, 1875) (Bluespotted mangrovegoby)
 Amoya madraspatensis (F. Day, 1868) (Manyband goby)
 Amoya moloanus (Herre, 1927) (Barcheek Amoya)
 Amoya signata (W. K. H. Peters, 1855) (Tusk goby)
 Amoya veliensis (Geevarghese & John, 1982)

References

Gobiinae